Abilene State Park is a  park near Lake Abilene south of Abilene, Texas. It features camping, trailer facilities, picnicking, shelters, a swimming pool, and hiking. A large grove of oak, cedar, elm and pecan trees, now a favorite picnic area, was once a campground for Comanche Indians.

Much of the early development of the park was done by the Civilian Conservation Corps in the 1930s. The stone water tower and the swimming pool complex are the most impressive of the structures built during the period.

See also

 List of Texas state parks

References

External links

 Abilene State Park

State parks of Texas
Protected areas of Taylor County, Texas
Civilian Conservation Corps in Texas